Aav Taru Kari Nakhu is a 2017 Gujarati comedy film Produced by Vikas Verma & Sunny Agrawal, Directed by Rrahul Mevawala, Creative supervision and edited by Imtiaz Alam. The film stars Tiku Talsania, Amar Upadhyay, Aditya Kapadia, Monal Gajjar, Tanvi Thakkar, Manisha Kanojia, Tapan bhatt and Vikas Verma. Amar Upadhyay, who formerly played the role of ‘Mihir’ in Kyunki Saas Bhi Kabhi Bahu Thi TV show marks his debut in the Gujarati Film Industry with this film.

Plot 
A stoic widower father wishes his sons to get married who show no interest in doing so. He then falls in love and ends up marrying his college sweetheart. Incidentally, the sons too fall in love around the same time and express their desire to get married. However, fearing their girlfriends would reject their proposals if they find their father has recently married, they attempt innovative and hilarious ways to sabotage their father's marriage.

Cast 
 Tiku Talsania as Hasmukh
 Manisha Kanojia as Shakuntla
 Amar Upadhyay as Dushyant
 Monal Gajjar as Meena
Aditya Kapadia as Himanshu
 Tanvi Thakkar as Teena
 Tapan A Bhatt as Kaki Kaka
 Vikas Verma as Vikas

Track listing
Songs are on Zee Music Gujarati as below:

Track listing
Songs are as follows

Release 
The Film was released in cinemas on 2 June 2017 in Gujarat and Maharashtra.

References

External links
 

2017 films
Films shot in Gujarat
Indian comedy films
2010s Gujarati-language films